Beşiktaş Çarşı Grubu (referred to simply as Çarşı) is the best known supporter group of BJK (Beşiktaş Gymnastics Club, notably including the Beşiktaş football club).
At their home ground in Vodafone Park, Çarşı locate themselves on the curva of Kapalı (Covered Stand) and are known for their social and political commentary, choreography, and genuine manner of chanting.  

There are many catch-phrases of the group, "Çarşı, her şeye karşı!" (English: Çarşı is against everything!") being probably the most famous one.

In May 2008, Çarşı disbanded itself unexpectedly. However, in the 2013 Turkish protests, Çarşı was a central mobilizing force for anti-Erdogan protests.

Definition
In Turkey; Beşiktaş, Fenerbahçe and Galatasaray are accepted as the biggest three clubs (Trabzonspor is the fourth occasionally), as they are the most successful ones in Turkish football history, and have the highest number of supporters. There are also numerous supporter groups of many teams, i.e. ultrAslan for Galatasaray, Genç FB for Fenerbahçe, Group Yalı for Göztepe A.Ş. etc. The groups' names are related to a team's name or badge, the symbol of the city, or a specific place inside the city. The name 'Çarşı' is also an example for this situation. Çarşı literally means "Marketplace" in Turkish. In the 1980s, the young people of Beşiktaş district who were supporting Beşiktaş J.K. were usually spending their time around the bazaar, located in the center of the district. They were living, coming together and supporting the team together in that specific place. This lifestyle led them to found the group with the name of Çarşı in 1982.

Although Çarşı is basically accepted as a fan group, Çarşı may be defined better as a common way of acting, including the shared beliefs of the fans; therefore Çarşı is a dignity, or a form of common soul among Beşiktaş fans. According to a well-known fan, Alp Batu Keçeci, Çarşı is described as an abstract notion rather than a basic and solid fan group.

This definition collected positive reactions of the supporters and it was embraced over time. Many of the internet fan forums have given place for this article.

Characteristics
Çarşı separates itself from the other fan groups by its members' attitude during the matches, and with their placards. The group was formed in 1981–82 season and their fame began to spread in the 1990s. Çarşı does not have a homogenous structure and it does not consist of a certain group of people with a specific identity. People from different social backgrounds, cultural environments, and ethnic origins are assembled at the group even though they support opposite ways of thinking in terms of politics or ideologies. An all-around antagonist image and attitude represent the basic characteristics of the group.

The name of the group comes from the central market place of Beşiktaş district, which is located in downtown, near the Istanbul Bosphorus. Beşiktaş Çarşı contains many restaurants, bars, a big fish market, and also numerous cosmetics, clothing and technology shops. There the fans assemble and pass their time with various activities until the matches. It is possible to see the fans on match days, wearing black-and-white jerseys at the fish restaurants and bars. Also, the newly produced chants by Beşiktaş fans are usually sung and embraced for the first time in Beşiktaş Çarşı.

After their meetings, fans generally walk to the home ground, İnönü Stadium passing Dolmabahçe Palace. They generally prefer to arrive there about 2 or 3 hours before the matches; however, majority of people do not get in the stadium instantly. They also like to hang around the stadium just before going in, for different reasons such as meeting their friends, to have some drinks or to chant right before the matches.
 
In Istanbul, supporters live on both the European and Asian sides of the Bosphorus, and so do Çarşı members. The inhabitants of the Asian side travel to the stadium by both road and sea transportation, but sea transportation is used more frequently. The fans mainly get on the ferries from Kadıköy or Üsküdar districts, where they can arrive at Beşiktaş in approximately 20 minutes. 
There are both directly related members of group and just normal supporters who want to be a part of action; also it is likely to see many university students among the members. Therefore, the group stand out with its quip, witty and humorist aspect. Çarşı generally react the topics and incidents with an unexpected manner.

Çarşı utilize some symbols to express their opinions. One of them is a derivative form of letter A, as it is used in the notion of anarchy. However, Çarşı states that they re-shaped the symbol with extending the low ends of the letter to show the difference. Hence, they use the letter as a symbol of rebellious soul. This idea was the inspiration for the name of the TV documentary  dedicated to the group, which was begun in 2007 (the group's 25th anniversary) and which came out on DVD in 2008.

The assortment of support is very wide; teenage and elderly fans alike consider themselves members and participate. The fans wear the official team products as well as the products based on Çarşı.

Defunction and reactions
On 28 May 2008, Çarşı concluded its presence by a farewell letter written by Alen Markaryan, arguably the main cheerleader. During the Press Gala of  documentary, Markaryan declared that they decided to disband the group after discussions which questioned the group's position as coming before Beşiktaş J.K. itself for the supporters. According to the newspapers, some subsequent reactions came up even in the gala. Discussions not yet finished. In internet forums, some users cite that they are proponents of the decision, but are also showing the tendency to keep the group's ideology and legacy. On the other hand, there are also users who believe that Çarşı cannot be ended like a defunct organization, as its roots are deeper and more philosophical than those of a typical fan group.

2013 Turkey protests

Çarşı played a significant role in the 2013 protests in Turkey, resisting police attacks and even chasing a water cannon away with an excavator they acquired.

References

Bibliography
Books

External links
Official website
European Ultras List
Rebellious Soul (Çarşı) Documentary

Beşiktaş J.K.
Association football supporters
Turkish football supporters' associations
Ultras groups
1982 establishments in Turkey